The proposed National Unification Promotion Law of the People's Republic of China is a document that appeared in early 2004 as a suggestion to create formal a legal basis for the People's Republic of China's unification with Taiwan.  It was authored by a Chinese scholar Yu Yuanzhou (余元州), a professor from the Jianghan University in Wuhan who does not have a formal governmental position.  Although no formal legislative action has been taken on the document, it was widely discussed in China. The reactions to the proposed document was mixed, with some, mainly in Taiwan, saying it provided evidence of hostile intent on the part of the PRC, while others praising it for proposing flexible solutions to the intractable conflict.

This proposal has not been directly incorporated in the bill (which later passed into law). None of the policies (e.g. the federal policy, or a new currency, see below) appeared in the final, official anti-secession law of the PRC.

Although Taiwan was ceded to Japan in the treaty of Shimonoseki ratified in 1895 – then surrendered by Japan in 1945 to the Kuomintang Administration – the PRC government considers Taiwan to be the 23rd province of the People's Republic of China. The historical claim is based on the formal incorporation of Taiwan into the Qing empire in 1680. From the political perspective, according to the PRC argument, the government of the Republic of China ceased to be legitimate following its retreat to Taiwan in 1949, and thus all sovereignty and governmental authority in China was automatically transferred to the PRC, including that of Taiwan which was then under ROC administration. The official ROC line counters that it did not cease to exist in 1949 and has continued to function as a sovereign political entity on Taiwan to the present day, making the relation between the PRC and ROC similar to that between other states similarly partitioned (such as North Korea and South Korea). The PRC's position has been acknowledged by most other nations but not formally recognized, as most nations prefer to take an ambiguous approach on the issue. See Political status of Taiwan.

Since 1949, the PRC government has demanded that Taiwan unify under the PRC, and has reserved the right to use military force to compel Taiwan to do so if necessary. However, opinion polls conducted in Taiwan have indicated that there is very little support for unification on the PRC's terms, even among those who favor eventual unification, making peaceful unification unlikely for the foreseeable future. With the reelection of Chen Shui-bian to the ROC Presidency, and the growth of Taiwan independence sentiment, a new Taiwanese identity appears to be emerging on the island as opposed to identification with China. In 2008, the KMT regained both the presidency and the legislature with a pair of election victories over the DPP.

In a string of unsuccessful efforts to change Taiwanese public opinion, several propositions and leaks from PRC governmental organs expressed consideration for a law aiming to formalize the policy for Chinese unification between mainland China and Taiwan under the authority of the PRC. This culminated in May 2004, when Premier Wen Jiabao pronounced to a group of Chinese expatriates in London that serious consideration of such a law would be taken. Several days later, Yu's suggestion (similar to a green paper) emerged.

Provisions of the initial proposal by Yu Yuanzhou
The draft document has 31 articles, organized in 8 chapters.  Its provisions touch mostly constitutional law.

Article 2 establishes Taiwan as the "Taiwan Special Political Area of PRC, or Taiwan SPA of PRC for short"; this appears to be an administrative division of the PRC distinct from the Special Administrative Region espoused by the PRC government for Taiwan.  Curiously, it allows Chinese people loyal (or having affinity) to the Republic of China to transiently view the mainland as "The Mainland Special Political Area of ROC, or The Mainland SPA of ROC" (中華民國大陸特別政治區). Article 3 reiterated the PRC's aim to implement the 'one country, two systems' policy for Taiwan, which would be brought into reality with military force if necessary.

Article 8 exempts Taiwan from any PRC imposed taxes. Chapter 3 proposes the establishment of a new, common currency called the Chinese dollar set by fiat to be worth 0.1 grams of gold forever.

Two methods of unification are laid out as options: Constitutional arrangement for peaceful unification is contained in Chapter 4: the Constitution of the Republic of China which is used in Taiwan is said to be obsolete; a federation is proposed. Chapter 5 provides the legal basis for non-peaceful (military) methods of unification.  The conditions for the use of armed force are set out, and explicitly states that the PRC may not limit itself to the use of conventional weapons, implying the use of weapons of mass destruction. Article 18 also stipulates that Taiwan will be subject to attack should it defy policy set by the PRC government.

Chapter 6 provides for honours for those promoting unification, whereas Chapter 7 sets out criminal penalties against separatism—limited to acts carried out within Chinese territory, and acts carried out anywhere by Chinese residents in the Mainland, Macau, Hong Kong, and Taiwan.

Article 30, section 1 provides that the law and subsequent changes thereof are to be carried out by the National People's Congress and signed into force by the President of the People's Republic of China—parenthetically, 'Head of State', probably to infer the possibility of a different position once the law takes effect; section 2 provides that permanent sections of the law cannot be changed unless later agreements contain promises that are 'more favourable' (更加优惠, but the beneficiary is unspecified); section 3 states that the law is lower than the Constitution of the People's Republic of China but higher than any other laws of the land.

Reaction
The ROC President Chen Shui-bian has expressed serious concerns about this proposal, and has expressed doubts that the Taiwanese public would find it acceptable. Chen also pointed out that the law being proposed is mostly intended as a measure to legitimize the PRC's military threats against the ROC. Furthermore, the proposed law would incriminate anyone holding opinions other than those supporting PRC policy on the question of unification. Under the law dissidents would be prosecuted under charges of treason, retroactively effective up to 100 years, raising serious questions about freedom of speech and civil liberties. Chen stated that the law would only serve to increase the feelings of animosity of the Taiwanese people towards the PRC and increase tensions.

It has been unclear as to the degree to which this law is or was ever taken seriously by PRC authorities. The law
was proposed by an individual without any governmental authority, and no formal action on the law has ever been taken by the National People's Congress. After summer 2004, references to the proposed law on both sides of the straits became rare, leading many to conclude that it was released by the PRC mainly to gauge public opinion. Shortly after this proposal, the PRC enacted the Anti-Secession Law.

See also
 Anti-Secession Law (final passage of a related bill)
 Political status of Taiwan
 Chinese unification
 Taiwan independence
 Taiwan Relations Act
 Canadian Bill C-20 (counter-independence law regarding Quebec)
 Secession

References

External links
 report of Wen Jiabao on drafting and passing the law
 interview with Yu Yuanzhou
 full text of the suggestion document
 Taiwan News editorial on the proposed law

Constitutional law
Cross-Strait relations